Bismuth silicon oxide is a solid inorganic compound of bismuth, silicon and oxygen. Its most common chemical formula is Bi12SiO20, though other compositions are also known. It occurs naturally as the mineral sillénite and can be produced synthetically, by heating a mixture of bismuth and silicon oxides. Centimeter-sized single crystals of Bi12SiO20 can be grown by the Czochralski process from the molten phase. They exhibit piezoelectric, electro-optic, elasto-optic, photorefractive and photoconductive properties, and therefore have potential applications in spatial light modulators, acoustic delay lines and hologram recording equipment. Bi12SiO20 can be obtained as a whitish powder with band gap of approximately 3.2 eV starting from bismuth subcarbonate and silica in presence of ethyleneglycol. 29Si solid-state NMR is used to proof that the Si(IV) cations are sharing oxygen atoms with the Bi(III) cations. The 29Si chemical shift (δ) in Bi12SiO20 is −78.1 ppm. Unlike the bismuth oxide, the presence of the acidic Si(IV) cations avoid the reactivity with CO2.

Another bismuth silicate has formula Bi2O9Si3.

References

Bismuth compounds
Inorganic silicon compounds
Oxides